Néstor Gabriel Furlán (born October 13, 1964) is an Argentine racing driver. He has run in different series, with major success in Formula Three Sudamericana and TC2000.

Between 1992 and 2019, he owned the GF Racing team.

Racing record

Career summary

Complete International Formula 3000 results
(key) (Races in bold indicate pole position) (Races in italics indicate fastest lap)

References

External links 
Official Site of Gabriel Furlan 
Official Site of GF Racing 

TC 2000 Championship drivers
Formula 3 Sudamericana drivers
Formula Renault Argentina drivers
Argentine racing drivers
Top Race V6 drivers
International Formula 3000 drivers
Stock Car Brasil drivers
1964 births
Living people
Motorsport team owners